The 1998–99 Calgary Flames season was the 19th National Hockey League season in Calgary.  The Flames opened their season up at "home", in Tokyo, Japan, as the NHL scheduled a two-game series in the Asian country between the Flames and the San Jose Sharks.

The Flames were plagued by numerous injuries to their goaltenders, including both starter Ken Wregget and backup Tyler Moss at the same time.  Ultimately, the Flames were forced to recall Tyrone Garner from his junior team on an emergency basis before finally signing Fred Brathwaite, who was playing in Europe with the Canadian National team.  The highly popular Brathwaite recorded a shutout against the Dallas Stars in his first start, allowing the Flames goaltending situation to stabilize.  In all, the Flames used six different goaltenders.

February 28, 1999, marked the end of an era for the Flames, as diminutive star Theoren Fleury was dealt to the Colorado Avalanche in a five player trade that ultimately saw prospect Robyn Regehr come to the Flames as part of the deal. Fleury was the Flames' all-time leading scorer when he was dealt.  The deal was made as the small-market Flames felt they would be unable to meet Fleury's contract demands, as he was set to become an Unrestricted Free Agent in the summer.

Despite losing their top star, the Flames proceeded to win seven of their first ten games without Fleury, propelling them into a playoff position. Calgary would win only two of their last eleven games, however, falling to 9th in the conference and missing the playoffs by six points.

Before being dealt, Fleury represented the Flames at the 1999 NHL All Star Game, recording two assists for the North American team.

During this season, the Flames introduced the "flaming horse" third jerseys in conjunction with the "Year of the Cowboy."

Prior to the season, the Flames lost defenceman Joel Bouchard to the Nashville Predators in the 1998 NHL Expansion Draft.  In addition, the Flames dealt Jim Dowd to the Preds in exchange for a promise not to draft a goaltender in the draft.

Regular season

Season standings

Schedule and results

Player statistics

Skaters
Note: GP = Games played; G = Goals; A = Assists; Pts = Points; PIM = Penalty minutes

†Denotes player spent time with another team before joining Calgary.  Stats reflect time with the Flames only.

Goaltenders
Note: GP = Games played; Min = Minutes played; W = Wins; L = Losses; T = Ties; GA = Goals against; SO = Shutouts; GAA = Goals against average

†Denotes player spent time with another team before joining Calgary.  Stats reflect time with the Flames only.

Transactions
The Flames were involved in the following transactions during the 1998–99 season.

Trades

Free agents

Draft picks

Calgary's picks at the 1998 NHL Entry Draft, held in Buffalo, New York.

Farm teams

Saint John Flames
The Baby Flames finished the 1998–99 AHL season with a record of 31–40–8–1, fourth in the Atlantic Division with 71 points.  They proceeded to shock the division winning Lowell Lock Monsters in the first round of the playoffs 3 games to 0.  The Flames would then be swept themselves by the Fredericton Canadiens.  Martin St. Louis led the Flames in both goals (28) and points (62). Saint John used five different goaltenders as a result of Calgary's injury woes in goal. Jean-Sebastien Giguere played the most games, going 18–16–3 in 39 games.

Johnstown Chiefs
The Flames signed a secondary affiliation deal with the Johnstown Chiefs of the East Coast Hockey League prior to the start of the season. They finished 27–34–9, fifth, and last, in the Northeast Division.  The Chiefs missed the playoffs.

See also
1998–99 NHL season

References
 
 
 
 

Player stats: 2006–07 Calgary Flames Media Guide, p. 113.
Game log: Flames 1998–99 results, usatoday.com, accessed January 12, 2007.
Team standings: 1998–99 NHL standings @hockeydb.com.
Trades: hockeydb.com Player pages.

Notes

Calgary Flames seasons
Calgary Flames season, 1998-99
Calg